The enzyme all-trans-retinyl ester 13-cis isomerohydrolase (EC 3.1.1.90; systematic name all-trans-retinyl ester acylhydrolase, 13-cis retinol forming  catalyses the reaction 
 an all-trans-retinyl ester + H2O  13-cis-retinol + a fatty acid

References

External links 
 

EC 3.1.1